The Collected Recordings: Sixties to Nineties is a 16-bit digitally remastered three-disc compilation album by American singer Tina Turner. The 48-track compilation was released in the United States on November 15, 1994, by Capitol Records.

Overview
The set collects recordings from Turner's—at the time—30-year-long career, starting with her 1960 debut single with Ike & Tina Turner, "A Fool in Love", and concluding with 1993's "I Don't Wanna Fight" from the soundtrack to the biographical film What's Love Got to Do with It.

Disc one
Disc one focuses on Turner's career with the Ike & Tina Turner Revue featuring a selection of their singles and best-known cover versions such as "It's Gonna Work Out Fine", "I Idolize You", "River Deep - Mountain High", "Bold Soul Sister", "Nutbush City Limits", Otis Redding's "I've Been Loving You Too Long", Sly & the Family Stone's "I Want to Take You Higher", The Beatles' "Come Together", Creedence Clearwater Revival's "Proud Mary" and The Rolling Stones "Honky Tonk Women".

Disc two
Disc two opens with Turner's first solo single "Acid Queen" from the film version of The Who's rock opera Tommy followed by one of the last recordings she made with her former husband, her cover version of Led Zeppelin's "Whole Lotta Love" taken from the Acid Queen album in 1975. The disc continues with two of the songs Turner recorded with the B.E.F. (British Electric Foundation) in the early 1980s that became the starting point of her comeback, "Ball of Confusion" and "A Change Is Gonna Come" - both tracks however are remixes dating from 1991, live tracks like Prince's "Let's Pretend We're Married", Robert Palmer's "Addicted to Love" and ZZ Top's "Legs", her subsequent duets with Bryan Adams, Eric Clapton and Rod Stewart, single B-sides such as "When I Was Young" and "Don't Turn Around" coupled with a few rarities like "Johnny and Mary" from the 1982 soundtrack Summer Lovers and the 1983 demo recording "Games".

Disc three
Disc three comprises fifteen of Turner's greatest hits following her comeback with the 1984 Private Dancer album, among them "Let's Stay Together", "What's Love Got to Do with It", "Typical Male", "What You Get Is What You See" "The Best" and "Steamy Windows".

Omissions
Notable omissions from the Collected Recordings track list are, among others, tracks from Turner's solo albums, Tina Turns the Country On! (1974), Rough (1978) and Love Explosion (1979), recorded for United Artists/EMI. The single "One of the Living" from the Mad Max: Beyond Thunderdome soundtrack is also missing.

Track listing

Personnel
Carter – executive producer
Roger Davies – executive producer
John Owen – boxset coordination
Jeremy Hammond – boxset coordination
Larry Walsh – digital remastered
Larry Grein – liner notes

Notes

References

1994 compilation albums
Capitol Records compilation albums
Tina Turner compilation albums